The Amazing Spider-Man: Music from the Motion Picture is a soundtrack album to the 2012 film The Amazing Spider-Man, composed by James Horner and released by Sony Classical.

Track listing
Source:

Additional music
"No Way Down" - Written by James Mercer and performed by The Shins
"Big Brat" - Written by Alexander Greenwald and performed by Phantom Planet
"Til Kingdom Come" - Written and performed by Coldplay
"0 Game" - Written and performed by Spyair

Charts

References

External links 
 Album review at movie-wave.net

2012 soundtrack albums
2010s film soundtrack albums
James Horner albums
Spider-Man film soundtracks
Sony Classical Records soundtracks
The Amazing Spider-Man (2012 film series)